is a Japanese footballer currently playing as a forward for Kyoto Sanga, as a designated special player.

Career statistics

Club
.

Notes

References

2001 births
Living people
Association football people from Osaka Prefecture
Kwansei Gakuin University alumni
Japanese footballers
Association football forwards
J1 League players
Kyoto Sanga FC players